is a Japanese boxer. He competed in the men's flyweight event at the 1984 Summer Olympics.

References

1961 births
Living people
Japanese male boxers
Olympic boxers of Japan
Boxers at the 1984 Summer Olympics
Place of birth missing (living people)
Asian Games medalists in boxing
Boxers at the 1982 Asian Games
Asian Games bronze medalists for Japan
Medalists at the 1982 Asian Games
Flyweight boxers